Rainer Simon (born 11 January 1941) is a German film director and screenwriter. He directed 17 films between 1964 and 2000. His How to Marry a King (1969) and Six Make it Through the World (1972) are highly imaginative adaptations of fairy tales by the Grimm Brothers. His 1975 Till Eulenspiegel is based on Renaissance stories, which Christa and Gerhard Wolf recast into a film narration incorporating period history.  His 1985 film The Woman and the Stranger won the Golden Bear award at the 35th Berlin International Film Festival. His 1980 film Jadup and Boel entered into the 16th Moscow International Film Festival in 1989.

Selected filmography
 How to Marry a King (1969) 
 Six Make It Through the World (1972)
 Till Eulenspiegel (1975) — film about Till Eulenspiegel (18+) 
 Jadup and Boel (1980)
  (1983) — based on a novel by Fritz Rudolf Fries
 The Woman and the Stranger (1985) — based on a novella by Leonhard Frank
  (1989) — film about Alexander von Humboldt
  (1991) — screenplay by Ulrich Plenzdorf, based on a story by Franz Fühmann

References

External links

1941 births
Living people
People from Hainichen, Saxony
Film people from Saxony
Socialist Unity Party of Germany politicians
Recipients of the National Prize of East Germany
Directors of Golden Bear winners